Stretching  across the Florida peninsula, State Road 70 (SR 70) spans five Florida counties and straddles the northern boundaries of two more.  Its western terminus is at US 41 (14th Street West) south of Bradenton (Manatee County); its eastern terminus is an intersection of Virginia Avenue and South Fourth Street (U.S. Route 1/SR 5) in Fort Pierce (St. Lucie County).

Route description
Between the termini, SR 70 serves the following Florida counties and cities:

 Manatee County – Bradenton, Oneco, Lakewood Ranch, Lorraine, Verna (on the boundary with Sarasota County), Parmalee, Myakka City, Edgeville
 DeSoto County – Pine Level, Arcadia
 Highlands County – Childs, Bairs Den, Bear Hollow, Brighton (northeast of a stretch of SR 70 on the boundary with Glades County)
 Okeechobee County – Okeechobee, Cypress Quarters. The route includes part of the Conners Highway
 St. Lucie County – Fort Pierce
SR 70 is signed throughout its entire route, including the mile-long stretch of road it shares with US 98 (State Road 700) in Okeechobee.

Major intersections

Spur in Bradenton

References

External links

Florida Route Log (SR 70)

070
070
070
070
070
070
070